In mathematics, the Arthur conjectures are some conjectures about automorphic representations of reductive groups over the adeles and unitary representations of reductive groups over local fields made by , motivated by the Arthur–Selberg trace formula.

Arthur's conjectures imply the generalized Ramanujan conjectures for cusp forms on general linear groups.

References

Automorphic forms
Representation theory
Conjectures